Mandoli is a village in the Bhiwani district of the Indian state of Haryana.

Villages in Bhiwani district